Harwood Heights is a village in Cook County, Illinois, United States. The population was 9,065 at the 2020 census. Harwood Heights and its neighbor Norridge form an enclave surrounded by the city of Chicago.

Geography
Harwood Heights is located at  (41.966172, -87.805576).

Harwood Heights and Norridge are surrounded by Chicago.

Demographics
As of the 2020 census there were 9,065 people, 3,282 households, and 2,331 families residing in the village. The racial makeup of the village was 74.59% White, 0.81% African American, 0.51% Native American, 9.66% Asian, 0.00% Pacific Islander, 6.92% from other races, and 7.51% from two or more races. Hispanic or Latino of any race were 16.09% of the population.

There were 3,282 households, out of which 46.28% had children under the age of 18 living with them, 56.61% were married couples living together, 8.62% had a female householder with no husband present, and 28.98% were non-families. 24.95% of all households were made up of individuals, and 10.54% had someone living alone who was 65 years of age or older. The average household size was 3.10 and the average family size was 2.56.

The village's age distribution consisted of 19.9% under the age of 18, 7.0% from 18 to 24, 30.2% from 25 to 44, 25.3% from 45 to 64, and 17.6% who were 65 years of age or older. The median age was 40.1 years. For every 100 females, there were 115.6 males. For every 100 females age 18 and over, there were 109.9 males.

The median income for a household in the village was $67,745, and the median income for a family was $90,821. Males had a median income of $52,317 versus $32,208 for females. The per capita income for the village was $33,171. About 8.5% of families and 10.3% of the population were below the poverty line, including 15.7% of those under age 18 and 12.7% of those age 65 or over.

Government and politics
, the mayor is Arlene Jezierny. She is the second woman to serve as mayor in Harwood Heights, the first being Margaret Fuller.

As of the 2021 election, the current elected officials of the village of Harwood Heights are:

 Arlene Jezierny - President (since 2009)
 Marcia Pollowy - Village Clerk (since 2009)
 Lawrence Steiner - Trustee (since 2009)
 Annette Brzezniak-Volpe - Trustee (since 2013)
 Anna Brzozowski-Wegrecki - Trustee (since 2016)
 Giuseppe Zerillo - Trustee (since 2017)
 Zbigniew Lewandowski - Trustee (since 2018)
 Eugene Brutto - Trustee (since 2021)

Harwood Heights is located in the Eisenhower Public Library District, Triton Community College District 504, Ridgewood High School School District 234, School Districts 86, 79, and 80, and the Norwood Park Fire Protection District.

Harwood Heights is located in Illinois's 5th congressional district which is represented in the 117th United States Congress by Mike Quigley (D–Chicago). In the Illinois General Assembly, Harwood Heights is located in the 10th Legislative District, 19th House District, and 20th House District. In the 101st General Assembly, Harwood Heights is represented by Robert Martwick (D–Chicago) in the Illinois Senate and represented by Lindsey LaPointe (D–Chicago) and Bradley Stephens (R–Rosemont) in the Illinois House of Representatives.

For the purposes of the Cook County Board of Commissioners, Harwood Heights is in the 9th district represented by Peter Silvestri (R-Elmwood Park). It is located in the 10th and 11th Judicial Subcircuits of the Cook County Circuit Clerk.

For the purposes of elections, Harwood Heights is split into five precincts ; Norwood Park 1, Norwood Park 5, Norwood Park 12, Norwood Park 15, and Norwood Park 17. In the 2020 presidential election, Harwood Heights cast 1,878 votes for Donald Trump and 1,692 votes for Joe Biden. Forty-six voters chose third party candidates and 42 voters pulled a ballot, but abstained from voting for any candidate for President.

Mayors of Harwood Heights

Local culture and media
Ridgewood High School Multimedia Clubs, which claim to be "the only media outlet in Norridge and Harwood Heights", and has 4 stations: The radio club produces "Jack FM 89.7 WRHS-FM Norridge" and "Theatre of the Ears on Smooth 88.1 WRWX-FM Harwood Heights/Jack Frost 88.1 WXMS Harwood Heights"; the television department runs in-house station "WRWX Television 4"; and the television club runs "WRHS Television 19".

 In 1942 the U.S. Open Golf Tournament was cancelled because of World War II and as a replacement the Chicago District Golf Association and the PGA sponsored a tournament called The Hale America National Open Golf Tournament. The tournament was won by Ben Hogan and raised over $20,000 for the Navy Relief Society and the U.S.O.

Education

Public schools
Three elementary school districts serve Harwood Heights:
 Pennoyer Elementary School District 79
 Norridge School District 80
 Union Ridge School District 86

Two high school districts serve Harwood Heights:
 Maine Township High School District 207 (Maine South High School)
 Ridgewood High School

Colleges and universities
Triton Junior College serves Harwood Heights.

Libraries
Eisenhower Public Library District serves Harwood Heights and Norridge.

Sister cities
Harwood Heights is twinned with two cities: Rocchetta a Volturno, Italy, and Dzierżoniów, Poland.

References

External links

 Village of Harwood Heights, Illinois — official site

Villages in Illinois
Villages in Cook County, Illinois
Chicago metropolitan area
Enclaves in the United States